Lombadan, also rendered as Lompehdan, may refer to:
 Lombadan-e Balai
 Lombadan-e Hajjiabad
 Lombadan-e Pain
 Lombadan-e Sheykh Ahmad